Galeazzo Benti (6 August 1923 – 21 April 1993) was an Italian actor. He appeared in more than 70 films between 1942 and 1991.

Life and career
Born Galeazzo Bentivoglio in Florence, Italy,  a descendant of the Bentivoglio family, which ruled Bologna from 1401 until 1506 and from 1511 until 1512, he started his career as a  cartoonist and a set designer. After his first roles in 1942, he had his breakout in 1943, in Sergio Tofano's Gian Burrasca, in which he played a frivolous and falsely modest snob, a role he specialized during his career. After successfully alternating between cinema and revue, in the late 1950s he moved to Venezuela, where he worked in a television channel dedicated to Italian immigrants. He came back to Italy in the early 1980s, and here he reprised his acting career equally splitting between films and TV-series until his death from a heart attack in 1993.

Selected filmography

 Souls in Turmoil (1942) - Un amico di Elena
 The Three Pilots (1942) - Andrea Torelli
 The Lady Is Fickle (1942) - Un giovanetto al teatro
 Annabella's Adventure (1943)
 Gian Burrasca (1943) - Tinti, il giornalista
 Gente dell'aria (1943) - Il tenente Prollo
 The Za-Bum Circus (1944) - (segment "Galop finale al circo")
 La freccia nel fianco (1945) - Duccio Massenti
 Life Begins Anew (1945) - Un cliente del ristorante (uncredited)
 Che distinta famiglia! (1945) - The real Michele di Montuja
 Departure at Seven (1946)
 Peddlin' in Society (1946) - Rorò di Torretia
 Il vento m'ha cantato una canzone (1947)
 Flesh Will Surrender (1947) - L'ufficiale di cavalleria
 The Two Orphans (1947) - Giorgio
 Dove sta Zaza? (1947)
 Cab Number 13 (1948) - Le commissaire Portier
 Fear and Sand (1948) - George
 The Dance of Death (1948)
 Accidenti alla guerra!... (1948) - F.23
 Be Seeing You, Father (1948) - Il 'contino'
 Una voce nel tuo cuore (1949)
 The Emperor of Capri (1949) - Dodo della Baggina
 Se fossi deputato (1949)
 Margaret of Cortona (1950) - Arsenio del Monte
 Totò Tarzan (1950) - L'esercitatore dei superparacadutisti
 The Transporter (1950) - Un cliente galante
 The Knight Has Arrived! (1950) - Marchese Bevilacqua
 Milano miliardaria (1951) - Walter
 La paura fa 90 (1951) - Carlo Champignon
 Seven Hours of Trouble (1951) - Ernesto
 Paris Is Always Paris (1951) - Gianni Forlivesi
 Amor non ho! Però, però.. (1951)
 Free Escape (1951)
 Three Girls from Rome (1952) - Marisa's friend
 Toto in Color (1952) - Poldo
 Wife For a Night (1952) - Maurizio
 Altri tempi (1952) - Amante della signora (segment "Il carrettino dei libri vecchi")
 I figli non si vendono (1952)
 Sunday Heroes (1952) - Benti - Lucy's wooer
 Primo premio: Mariarosa (1952)
 Poppy (1952) - Viveur del night
 The Piano Tuner Has Arrived (1952) - Un giornalista
 Canzoni di mezzo secolo (1952)
 Beauties on Motor Scooters (1952) - Gastone
 Fermi tutti... arrivo io! (1953) - Giornalista
 Cavalcade of Song (1953) - Il soldatino
 Viva la rivista! (1953)
 Scampolo 53 (1953)
 Canto per te (1953)
 Matrimonial Agency (1953) - Lodolini
 It Takes Two to Sin in Love (1954)
 Tears of Love (1954)
 Neapolitan Carousel (1954) - French tourist
 Papà Pacifico (1954) - Alberto di Pontenero - the baron
 Angela (1954) - Gustavo Venturi
 An American in Rome (1954) - Fred Buonanotte
 A Free Woman (1954) - Sergio Rollini
  Laugh! Laugh! Laugh! (1954) - Snob
 Toto in Hell (1955) - Il cantante esistenzialista
 Carovana di canzoni (1955) - Mickey Spillone
 Red and Black (1955)
 Yo y las mujeres (1959)
 Il dio serpente (1970) - Bernard Lucas
 Lola (1974) - Doctor
 El enterrador de cuentos (1978)
 La terrazza (1980) - Galeazzo
 Morituri (1984)
 Il commissario Lo Gatto (1987) - Barone Fricò
 Me and My Sister (1987) - Avv. Sironi
 Animali metropolitani (1987) - Dott. Cohen
 Mortacci (1989) - Tommaso Grillo
 Rouge Venise (1989) - Silvio Conio
 Massacre Play (1989) - Cornelius Plank
 Nel giardino delle rose (1990) - Troncucci
 Vacanze di Natale '90 (1990) - Principe Galiberti
 Rossini! Rossini! (1991) - La Rochefoucault
 Count Max (1991) - Conte Max

References

External links

1923 births
1993 deaths
Italian male film actors
Italian male stage actors
Italian male television actors
20th-century Italian male actors